Anika Smit (born 26 May 1986) is a South African professional athlete specialising in the high jump. She is well known for winning the gold at the 2006 Commonwealth Games in Melbourne. Her personal best is 1.93 metres achieved in 2007 in Potchefstroom.

Competition record

External links
 

1986 births
Living people
Afrikaner people
South African female high jumpers
Commonwealth Games gold medallists for South Africa
Athletes (track and field) at the 2006 Commonwealth Games
Commonwealth Games medallists in athletics
African Games silver medalists for South Africa
African Games medalists in athletics (track and field)
African Games bronze medalists for South Africa
Athletes (track and field) at the 2003 All-Africa Games
Athletes (track and field) at the 2007 All-Africa Games
Athletes (track and field) at the 2011 All-Africa Games
Medallists at the 2006 Commonwealth Games